Iwan Walters is an Australian politician who is the current member for the district of Greenvale in the Victorian Legislative Assembly. He is a member of the Labor Party and was elected in the 2022 state election.

Prior to becoming a politician, he served as a secondary school teacher, and is a graduate of Oxford University.

References 

Year of birth missing (living people)
Living people
Members of the Victorian Legislative Assembly
21st-century Australian politicians
Australian Labor Party members of the Parliament of Victoria